Rhopalum clavipes is a species of square-headed wasp in the family Crabronidae. It is found in Europe, Northern Asia (excluding China) and North America.

References

Further reading

External links

 

Crabronidae
Wasps described in 1758
Taxa named by Carl Linnaeus